Merja Kyllönen (born 25 January 1977) is a Finnish politician and Member of the European Parliament (MEP) from Finland. She is a member of the Left Alliance, part of the European United Left–Nordic Green Left. She was the Minister of Transport in Katainen Cabinet 2011–2014. Since 2014, she has been a Member of the European Parliament (MEP), representing Finland.

In 2018, Kyllönen was the candidate of the Left Alliance in the Finnish presidential election. In the election, Kyllönen placed seventh with 3 percent of the votes, while the incumbent president Sauli Niinistö went on to secure his second term with a majority of votes.

Early career
Merja Kyllönen graduated as a biomedical laboratory technician from Oulu Polytechnic from Suomussalmi, Kainuu region, Finland in 2000. While working as a laboratory officer and a technical assistant at a pharmacy, Kyllönen “continued her career in politics in the Council of the Kainuu region, among the representatives of Tradeka (2004–2011), and in the Parliament of Finland beginning in 2003.” She was serving at different capacities including “as a member of the Chancellery Commission and the Employment and Equality Committee. She was appointed to the executive board of the parliamentary group of the Left Alliance.”  Kyllönen brought far-reaching reforms in the transport sector during her tenure as the Minister of Transport in Katainen's Government. These include “a toll system favoring public transport and decreasing the alcohol level limit for driving under influence” and government resolution to convert Helsinki-Malmi Airport  into a residential area.

Parliamentary service
Member, Committee on Transport and Tourism
Member, Delegation to the EU-Russia Parliamentary Cooperation Committee

Kyllönen, as a rapporteur, supported the Fourth Railway Package.

Kyllönen served as rapporteur for the controversial directive on posted drivers, meant to update the Posted Workers Directive and related acts, amendments on which received very narrow and surprise majorities, including one on whether to ensure conditions of workers' accommodation and the reimbursement of expenditures related to their posting assignment, where over 50 MEPs changed their vote on the record after the result was determined. The text was eventually approved in April 2019, the fourth session which debated or voted on the subject.

In March 2019, Kyllönen was the recipient of the Transport and Tourism Award at The Parliament Magazine's annual MEP Awards.

References

External links
Merja Kyllönen

1977 births
Living people
People from Suomussalmi
Left Alliance (Finland) politicians
Ministers of Transport and Public Works of Finland
Members of the Parliament of Finland (2007–11)
Members of the Parliament of Finland (2011–15)
Members of the Parliament of Finland (2019–23)
MEPs for Finland 2014–2019
21st-century women MEPs for Finland
Left Alliance (Finland) MEPs
Women government ministers of Finland
Women members of the Parliament of Finland
Candidates for President of Finland